The Society for Experimental Mechanics honors members with the designation of Fellow for having made significant accomplishments to the field of mechanics.

1975

 D.C. Drucker
 M. Hetényi
 J.H. Meier
 F.G. Tatnall
 A.J. Durelli
 M.M. Leven
 W.M. Murray
 T.J. Dolan

The highest honor bestowed by the Society for Experimental Mechanics is the designation of Honorary Member, with a limit of ten living honorary members at any given time.  From the first naming of Francis G. Tatnall as an Honorary Member in 1953 to the introduction of the rank of Fellow in 1975, a total of nine Honorary Members had been named. The inaugural class of Fellows consisted of all of the Honorary Members to that time with the exception of Max M. Frocht who had passed away the year before. The bylaws have since stipulated that anyone named Honorary Member who was not already named Fellow would be automatically given this distinction, although only Raymond D. Mindlin has since been named Fellow and Honorary Member in the same year.

1976

 F.C. Bailey
 S.S. Manson
 R.E. Peterson
 P.K. Stein
 C.E. Taylor
 W.T. Bean
 F.J. McCormick
 C.R. Smith
 F.B. Stern
 F. Zandman

1977

 G. Ellis
 C.C. Perry
 W. Ramberg
 B.E. Rossi
 J.C. Telinde
 A.S. Kobayashi
 D. Post
 W.F. Riley
 C.W. Smith
 D.K. Wright

1978

 J.W. Dally
 A.E. Johnson
 E.O. Stitz
 M. Holt
 D.E. Niles
 W.F. Swinson

1979

 J.W. Dalley
 R.H. Homewood
 L.S. Srinath
 D.J. DeMichele
 S.S. Redner
 P.S. Theocaris

1980

 P.H. Adams
 L.J. Weymouth
 R.J. Sanford
 W.C. Young

1981

 I.M. Daniel
 V.J. Parks
 J. Dorsey
 C.E. Work

1982

 E.E. Day
 R.E. Rowlands
 E.I. Riegner
 C.A. Sciammarella

1983

 F.P. Chiang
 W.L. Fourney
 T.D. Dudderar
 D.R. Harting

1984

 C.W. Bert
 M.E. Fourney
 H.F. Brinson

1985

 C.P. Burger
 K.G. McConnell
 G.R. Irwin
 W.F. Ranson

1986

 K.H. Laermann
 R.D. Mindlin
 R. Mark
 J.T. Pindera

1987

 N.J. Hoff
 M.L. Williams, Jr.
 W.G. Knauss
 C. Lipson

1988

 J.F. Bell
 K.A. Stetson
 J. Der Hovanesian

1989

1990

1991

1992

 W.N. Sharpe, Jr.
 S.E. Swartz

1993

 J.A. Gilbert
 T.C. Huang

1994

 A. Shukla
 J.L. Turner

1995

 I.M. Allison
 G.E. Maddux

1996

 M. Nisida
 R. Prabhakaran

1997

 T. Kunio
 S.P. Wnuk, Jr.
 J.B. Ligon

1998

 M. Ramulu
 M.Y.Y. Hung
 J.F. Kalthoff

1999

 Michael M. Lemcoe
 Michael A. Sutton
 Thomas W. Corby, Jr.

2000

 K. Ravi-Chandar
 J. McKelvie
 Y.J. Chao

2001

 G.L. Cloud
 J.F. Doyle
 R.J. Pryputniewicz

2002

 R. Chona
 A. Lagarde

2003

 C.T. Liu
 M. Takashi
 K.M. Liechti

2004

 S.K. Foss
 E.E. Gdoutos

2005

 Mark Tuttle
 W.C. Wang

2006

 Bongtae Han
 Edwin K. P. Chong

2007

 Eann Patterson
 S.C. "Max" Yen

2008

2009

 Igor Emri
 Horacio D. Espinosa
 Ares J. Rosakis

2010

 Randall J. Allemang
 Yoshiharu Morimoto
 Jian Lu
 Guruswami Ravichandran

2011

 José L.F. Freire
 Sia Nemat-Nasser
 Carmine Pappalettere
 Hareesh V. Tippur

2012

 Edwin O'Brien
 Nancy Sottos
 Daniel Rittel

2013

 K.T. Ramesh
 John Lambros
 David Brown
 Fabrice Pierron

2014

 Archie A.T. Andonian
 Weinong (Wayne) Chen
 David J. Ewins
 Wolfgang Osten

2015

 Hugh Bruck
 Wendy C. Crone
 Peter G. Ifju
 Ghatu Subhash

2016

 Janice Dulieu-Barton
 K. Jane Grande-Allen
 Xiaodong Li
 Hongbing Lu

2017

 Eric N. Brown
 Jon Rogers
 Daniel Inman

2018

 Charles (Chuck) Farrar
 Michel Grédiac
 Francesco Lanza di Scalea
 Carlos Ventura

2019

 Amos Gilat
 Yu-Lung Lo
 Tusit Weerasooriya
 Alan Zehnder

2020

 Ioannis Chasiotis
 Phillip L. Reu
 Satoru Yoneyama
 Kristin Zimmerman

2021

 Douglas Adams
 Francois Hild
 Yasushi Miyano
 Michael Prime

2022

 Peter Avitabile
 Randall Mayes
 Vikas Prakash
 Gary Schajer

References 

Fellows of the Society for Experimental Mechanics